Year 317 (CCCXVII) was a common year starting on Tuesday (link will display the full calendar) of the Julian calendar. At the time, it was known as the Year of the Consulship of Gallicanus and Bassus (or, less frequently, year 1070 Ab urbe condita). The denomination 317 for this year has been used since the early medieval period, when the Anno Domini calendar era became the prevalent method in Europe for naming years.

Events 
 By place 
 Roman Empire 
 March 1 – Emperor Constantine the Great and co-emperor Licinius elevate their sons Crispus, Constantine II (being still a baby) and Licinius II to Caesars. After this arrangement Constantine rules the dioceses Pannonia and Macedonia, and establishes his residence at Sirmium, from where he prepares a campaign against the Goths and Sarmatians.
 Licinius recognizes Constantine I as senior emperor and executes Valerius Valens.

 Asia 
 Sixteen Kingdoms: Jingwen (later Yuan of Jin) flees with remnants of the Jin court and noble families to the south. He succeeds Emperor Min of Jin as first ruler of the Eastern Jin Dynasty and decides to make Jiankang (modern Nanjing) his new capital.
 The earliest historically verified reference to tea is recorded, although the Chinese have been drinking the beverage for centuries.

Births 
 August 7 – Constantius II, Roman emperor (d. 361)
 Fú Jiàn, Chinese emperor of the Former Qin (d. 355)
 Junius Bassus Theotecnius, Roman politician (d. 359)
 Themistius, Byzantine statesman and philosopher

Deaths 
 Valerius Valens, Roman emperor

References